Otze may refer to:

 Ötzi, a prehistoric man whose mummy was found in a glacier in 1991
 Frank Ordenewitz, a German footballer